The Chase! is a live album by saxophonists Dexter Gordon and Gene Ammons recorded in Chicago in 1970 and released on the Prestige label.

Reception
The AllMusic review stated "this CD is highly recommended to fans of tenor battles and straight-ahead jazz".

Track listing 
 "Wee Dot" (J. J. Johnson) - 17:17 Bonus track on CD reissue     
 "Polka Dots and Moonbeams" (Johnny Burke, Jimmy Van Heusen) - 10:07     
 "The Chase" (Dexter Gordon, Wardell Gray) - 10:29     
 "Medley: Lover Man (Oh, Where Can You Be?)/I Can't Get Started/My Funny Valentine/Misty" (Jimmy Davis, Ram Ramirez, James Sherman/Ira Gershwin, Vernon Duke/Lorenz Hart, Richard Rodgers/Erroll Garner) - 14:03 Bonus track on CD reissue     
 "Lonesome Lover Blues" (Billy Eckstine, Gerald Valentine) - 13:25     
 "The Happy Blues" (Art Farmer) - 5:26

Personnel 
Gene Ammons (tracks 3-6), Dexter Gordon (tracks 1-5) - tenor saxophone
Jodie Christian  (tracks 3-5), John Young (tracks 1, 2 & 6) - piano
Cleveland Eaton (tracks 1, 2 & 6), Rufus Reid (tracks 3-5) - bass
Wilbur Campbell (tracks 3-5), Steve McCall (tracks 1, 2 & 6) - drums
Vi Redd - vocal (track 5)

References 

1970 live albums
Gene Ammons live albums
Dexter Gordon live albums
Prestige Records live albums
Collaborative albums